Ad tracking, also known as post-testing or ad effectiveness tracking, is in-market research that monitors a brand’s performance including brand and advertising awareness, product trial and usage, and attitudes about the brand versus their competition.

Depending on the speed of the purchase cycle in the category, tracking can be done continuously (a few interviews every week) or it can  be “pulsed,” with interviews conducted in widely spaced waves (ex. every three or six months). Interviews can either be conducted with separate, matched samples of consumers, or with a single (longitudinal) panel that is interviewed over time.

Since the researcher has information on when the ads launched, the length of each advertising flight, the money spent, and when the interviews were conducted, the results of ad tracking can provide information on the effects of advertising.

Purpose
The purpose of ad tracking is generally to provide a measure of the combined effect of the media weight or spending level, the effectiveness of the media buy or targeting, and the quality of the advertising executions or creative.

Advertisers use the results of ad tracking to estimate the return on investment (ROI) of advertising, and to refine advertising plans. Sometimes, tracking data are used to provide inputs to Marketing Mix Models which marketing science statisticians build to estimate the role of advertising, as compared to pricing, distribution and other marketplace variables on sales of the brand.

Methodology
Today, most ad tracking studies are conducted via the Internet. Some ad tracking studies are conducted continuously and others are conducted at specific points in time (typically before the advertising appears in market, and then again after the advertising has been running for some period of time). The two approaches use different types of analyses, although both start by measuring advertising awareness. Typically, the respondent is either shown a brief portion of a commercial or a few memorable still images from the TV ad. Other media typically are cued using either branded or de-branded visual of the ad. Then, respondents answer three significant questions.
 Do you recognize this ad? (recognition measure)
 Please type in the sponsor of this ad. (unaided awareness measure)
 Please choose from the following list, the sponsor of this ad. (aided awareness measure)

The continuous tracking design analyzes advertising awareness over time, in relation to ad spending; separately, this design tracks brand awareness, and then develops indices of effectiveness based on the strength of the correlations between ad spending and brand awareness.

The most popular alternate approach to the continuous tracking design is the Communicants System longitudinal design, in which the same people are interviewed at two points in time. Changes in brand measures (for example, brand purchasing and future purchase intentions) exhibited among those who have seen the advertising are compared to the changes in brand measures that occurred among those unaware of advertising. By means of this method, the researchers can isolate those marketplace changes that were produced by advertising versus those that would have occurred without advertising.

Internet tracking
There are several different tools to track online ads: banner ads, ppc ads, pop-up ads, and other types.  Several online advertising companies such as Google offer their own ad tracking service (Google Analytics) in order to effectively use their service to generate a positive ROI.  Third-party ad tracking services are commonly used by affiliate marketers.  Affiliate marketers are frequently unable to have access to the order page and therefore are unable to use a 3rd-party tool.  Many different companies have created tools to effectively track their commissions in order to optimize their profit potential.  The information provided will show the marketer which advertising methods are generating income and which are not and allows him to effectively allocate his budget.

Last-click attribution means the belief that the last ad a person saw actually generated the sale, which is often not the case. However, if a person saw an ad on one web site before switching to another and then made a purchase, there is a chance the data cannot be shared after the person changed sites, meaning only last-click attribution is available.

Measures
Here is a list of some of the data a post-test might provide: 

Top of mind awareness
Unaided brand awareness
Aided brand awareness
Brand fit
Brand image ratings
Brand trial
Engagement/ involvement
Repeat purchase
Frequency of use
Price perceptions
Unaided advertising awareness
Aided advertising awareness
Unaided advertising message recall
Aided advertising message recall
Aided commercial recall
Ad wear out
Promotion awareness and usage
Purchase intention
Market segment characteristics
Media habits
Lifestyle/Psychographics
Demographics

See also

Advertising
Advertising management 
Advertising Research
Brand management
Effective frequency
Integrated marketing communications
Marketing research
Web analytics
Advertising Checking Bureau
Branding
Communicus
Brand Image
Brand Linkage
Global Advertising
Marketing
Marketing communications
Mass media
Media planning
Marketing research
Motivation
 New media
 Positioning (marketing)
 Promotion
 Promotional mix
 Reach (advertising)

Further reading
 Zeff, Robbin (1999). Advertising on the Internet, 2nd Edition. John Wiley & Sons 
 Linktrack (2008). "Ad Tracker: Definition and Use".
 Kaushik, Avinash (2009). Web Analytics 2.0: The Art of Online Accountability and Science of Customer Centricity Sybex.
 Ravi Pathak & Siegfried Stepke (2014). "Webinar: Understanding the Impact of TV Advertisement on Website Traffic".

References

 Young, Charles E., The Advertising Research Handbook, Ideas in Flight, Seattle, WA, April 2005, 
 Rydholm, Joseph (2000). "Campaigning for the outdoors". Quirk's Marketing Research Review. Retrieved on 2008-12-1

Advertising
Market research
Promotion and marketing communications